Sudhir Tailang (26 February 1960 – 6 February 2016) was an Indian cartoonist.

Career

Tailang was born in Bikaner, Rajasthan, on 26 February 1960. Tailang, who made his first cartoon in 1970, started his career with the Illustrated Weekly of India, Mumbai, in 1982. In 1983, he joined the Navbharat Times in Delhi. For several years he was with the Hindustan Times, while also doing short stints with the Indian Express and The Times of India. His last assignment was with the Asian Age. In 2004 he was awarded Padma Shri in the field of Literature & Education. 
He launched a book of cartoons titled No, Prime Minister in 2009, a set of cartoons on the former Prime Minister of India Manmohan Singh. He died on 6 February 2016 of brain cancer.

References

External links
 'Here & Now' at Bookfinder.com
 Bibliography at WorldCat

Indian cartoonists
1960 births
2016 deaths
Rajasthani people
Recipients of the Padma Shri in literature & education
People from Bikaner
Indian editorial cartoonists
Deaths from cancer in India
Deaths from brain tumor